Kastrychnitskaya is a Minsk Metro station. It opened on June 30, 1984.

The station is one of three on the Minsk Metro to have been built with an entrance in an existing building, the other two being Kupalawskaya and Ploshcha Lyenina.

2011 bombing

Kastrychnitskaya station was the site of the Minsk Metro bombing on April 11, 2011.

Gallery

References

Minsk Metro stations
Railway stations opened in 1984